Pat Parfrey (born November 1, 1991) is a Canadian international rugby union player who plays for the Toronto Arrows of Major League Rugby (MLR). He was also a replacement player at the 2015 Rugby World Cup.

Parfrey joined the Toronto Arrows in April 2019. He made his Major League Rugby debut on April 28 as a second-half substitute in a 29–7 win over the Seattle Seawolves.

References

1991 births
Living people
Canadian rugby union players
Canada international rugby union players
Rugby union fly-halves
Rugby union fullbacks
Toronto Arrows players